

Cities

Towns

Townships

 
Nakhon Ratchasima Province